The 1976–77 Midland Football Combination season was the 40th in the history of Midland Football Combination, a football competition in England.

Division One

Division One featured all the 18 clubs which competed in the division last season, no new clubs joined the division this season.

League table

References

1976–77
M